A New Abridgment of the Law is a legal book compiled by Mathew Bacon. The first edition dates from 1736, and the most recent English edition in 1832.

The work is an abridgement of English common law which was widely used in the United States during the early- and mid-19th century. The work was compiled by Bacon, assembled mainly from the dissertations and treatises of Baron Gilbert, either quoting them in full or providing extracts thereof. Bacon died before completing the abridgement, and the collection was completed by Sergeant Sayer and Owen Ruffhead.

See also
Anthony Fitzherbert
Books of authority
D'Anvers' Abridgment
Rolle's Abridgment
Viner's Abridgment

References

Bacon, M. A new Abridgment of the Law. With large additions and corrections, by Sir Henry Gwillim and C. E. Dodd, and with notes and references made to the edition published in 1809, by Bird Wilson; to which notes and references to American and English law and decisions have been added, by John Bouvier. 10 vols. 8v. Philadelphia. 1842.

External links
Bacon et al. A New Abridgment of the Law. Sixth Edition. Dublin. 1793. Vols 2, 3,  4 and 5

Law books